Fiesta Macarena is a 1996 music album, based on Los del Río's hit single "Macarena", released by BMG US Latin.

Track listing
 "La Niña (Del Pañuelo Colorado) (The Party Radio Edit)" – 4:08
 "Tocalo, Tocalo" – 3:09
 "Macarena (Bayside Boys Remix)" – 4:12
 "San Sereni" – 4:37
 "No Te Vayas Todavía (The Old School Memê Remix)" – 3:53
 "Estas Pilla'o" – 4:28
 "Pura Carroceria (Memê Dance Short Remix)" – 4:38
 "Tengo, Tengo" – 4:24
 "El Sueño de la Marisma" – 3:31
 "La Polvareda" – 3:42
 "La Niña (Del Pañuelo Colorado) (The Afterhours Meme Dub)" – 6:43
 "Macarena (Original)" – 4:09

Bonus tracks:
 "Macarena (River Remix 103 BPM)" – 5:04
 "Macarena (New Remix by Bass Bumpers)" – 3:27
 "Macarena (Christmas Joy Remix, hidden track)" – 3:27

References
 

 

1996 albums
Los del Río albums